The 2022 National Premier Leagues Victoria 3 will be the second season of the National Premier Leagues Victoria 3, the third-tier competition in Victorian football. The fixtures for the season were released on 21 December 2021.

Teams
Twelve teams will compete in the league – eight teams who were relegated from the NPL 2 in 2019 and four teams who were promoted from the State League 1 in the same season.

Stadiums and locations

Note: Table lists in alphabetical order.

League table

Results

Season statistics

Scoring

Top scorers

References

External links
 Football Victoria official website

2022 in Australian soccer